The Mainline Steam Heritage Trust is a New Zealand charitable trust devoted to the restoration and operation of historic New Zealand Railways and overseas mainline steam locomotives. Regular day excursions and multi-day tours are operated over rail lines throughout New Zealand. Excursions are operated by the Auckland, Wellington and Christchurch branches.

About
The Trust began in 1988 after the Ferrymead 125 events in Christchurch. Based around the collection of steam locomotives that were privately owned by Ian Welch, the first of which had begun operating on the mainline with J 1211 with an excursion to Timaru and Arthurs Pass double-heading with the Glenbrook Vintage Railway's JA 1250.

Depots operated by the Trust included Parnell, (Auckland) Middleton and later Plimmerton. The Auckland depot used to be based in the former Parnell diesel depot. It was in the past the organisation's primary restoration base and most of Mainline Steam's currently active locomotives were restored there. It closed in 2015. Mainline Steam is developing a new depot at Mercer.

The Wellington depot, located at Plimmerton, is a purpose-built building that replaced the formerly leased Upper Hutt goods shed. It has now become the primary restoration base for the organisation. The depot in Christchurch is a former industrial building that used to be located at Studholme, it was relocated to land on the premises of CWF Hamilton. As of 2021, the trust was given notice to vacate the current Christchurch depot and is now building a new site at Midland Rail Heritage Trust's own lines and land in Springfield.

Mainline Steam is notable for having imported a number of African steam locomotives from South Africa and Zimbabwe (including a GMA/M Garratt), with more South African locomotives still overseas. It has also imported former British Rail Mark 2 carriages for use on its steam-hauled excursions and is in the process of overhauling them for New Zealand use. The organisation regularly operates excursions out of Auckland and Christchurch, the latter operating excursions primarily along the highly scenic Midland Line. Mainline Steam also has a number of diesel and electric locomotives in its care.

Heritage locomotives

Overseas locomotives 
In addition to their core fleet of New Zealand locomotives, Mainline Steam owns a number of ex-South African and Zimbabwean locomotives. Four are stored in South Africa at Bloemfontein. Several engines have been shipped to the Auckland and Wellington depots. It is anticipated that some will not be shipped to New Zealand but remain in South Africa.

Rolling stock register

Passenger rolling stock
Mainline Steam rosters a large fleet of carriages which will be formed into three trains:
 Train One – a 1920s-era train, painted in Emerald Green (lined out in Pullman Green style).
 Train Two – a train of 56' steel-panelled stock, painted Midnight blue with white lettering.
 Train Three – a train of BR MkII coaches, painted in Midnight Blue with Pearl Grey window band.

At present the stock for these trains are kept at Plimmerton and Middleton (with some MkII coaches stored at Feilding).

Train One

Train Two

Train Three

Freight rolling stock 
Mainline Steam has a large collection of freight rolling stock, mostly consisting of tank wagons used for oil and water storage, some of which are mainline certified. These wagons are largely of the UC class, although there is one example of each of the UCA and URK wagons preserved. The group also has a number of KP, ZA, and ZL class box wagons for use as secure storage for locomotive and carriage parts, along with several other general-use goods wagons.

Wagons

Excursions

Mainline Steam operate regular excursions using steam locomotives from the trust's collection. These run from Auckland, Wellington or Christchurch to a number of destinations. These range from short half-day excursions to an annual national tour lasting several weeks and covering much of KiwiRail's rail network.

References

Citations

Bibliography

External links 

 Mainline Steam

 J1211 at Porirua

Heritage railways in New Zealand
Transport organisations based in New Zealand
1988 establishments in New Zealand